Dudley Railway Tunnel is a railway tunnel located near to the former Dudley railway station in Dudley, West Midlands, England. It was opened in 1850 to allow the Oxford-Worcester-Wolverhampton Line between Stourbridge and Wolverhampton to pass for several hundred yards beneath a hilly area of Dudley which would have been difficult if not impossible to have constructed a railway through. At Dudley the OWWR and South Staffordshire Line to Walsall met.

The tunnel was regularly used by passenger trains until 1964, when the town's station closed along with the remaining passenger stations on the line, although goods trains were still allowed to use the line. It finally closed to all trains on 19 March 1993, when the section of railway between Walsall and Brierley Hill was closed after some 150 years in use. A cable laying train passed through the tunnel on 1 July 1993 - nearly four months after the line was officially closed.

The railway line through Dudley is scheduled to reopen in 2023 as part of an extension to the West Midlands Metro, although the Metro route would not include the railway tunnel, it will be used for test purposes by the Very Light Rail National Innovation Centre. The reutilised line will also be designed to carry freight trains.

Coordinates

References

Tunnels in the West Midlands (county)
Rail transport in Dudley
Railway tunnels in England
Tunnels completed in 1850
Buildings and structures in Dudley